Alice Gray (born 1992) is a Welsh science writer, who writes the blog Mindful of Science. She was recognized by the BBC's 100 Women in 2015 for her work advocating for the representation of women in STEM fields. She was recognized as one of the BBC's 100 women of 2021.

Career 
Gray started the blog Mindful of Science in 2013. The "STEMinist" blog discusses issues facing women in science, technology, engineering, and maths (STEM), arguing for the importance of diversity and representation in science and for removing barriers to women's advancement in STEM education and careers. Gray credits the blog with having given her opportunities to further advocate for women in STEM to governmental agencies and organizations. 

She also produces a podcast (Inside the Petri Dish), and a YouTube video series (Gray Matter), which address contemporary and popular science topics.

In 2015, Gray was recognized by the BBC's 100 Women for her science writing.

In interviews, Gray has mentioned a book project in progress, titled Women in White Coats, focused on the true stories of women in STEM.

She was recognized as one of the BBC's 100 women of 2021.

Personal life 
Gray was born in 1992. She has an identical twin sister, and was raised near Amroth, Pembrokeshire, Wales. 

Gray received a BSc in Neuroscience from Cardiff University in 2013.

References

External links 
Mindful of Science
Gray Matter (YouTube)
Inside the Petri Dish (podcast)

1992 births
British identical twins
Science writers
Welsh science writers
Welsh bloggers
Women science writers
Feminist bloggers
Living people
Welsh women bloggers
BBC 100 Women